Bartholomew Grant (born 13 August 1876, date of death unknown) was an Australian cricketer. He played two first-class cricket matches for Victoria in 1903.

See also
 List of Victoria first-class cricketers

References

External links
 

1876 births
Year of death missing
Australian cricketers
Victoria cricketers
Cricketers from Melbourne